Tahzeiko Soloman "Zeiko" Harris (born 7 May 1999) is a Bermudan footballer who plays as a defender for the Louisville Cardinals.

Career statistics

Club

Notes

International

References

External links
 
 Zeiko Harris at Appalachian State University
 Zeiko Harris at the University of Louisville

1999 births
Living people
Bermudian footballers
Bermuda youth international footballers
Bermuda international footballers
Association football defenders
USL League Two players
Appalachian State Mountaineers men's soccer players
Louisville Cardinals men's soccer players
Bermudian expatriate footballers
Bermudian expatriate sportspeople in the United States
Expatriate soccer players in the United States